Hans Meyer (21 July 1925 – 3 April 2020) was a South African actor born to German parents. In Britain, he was known for his portrayal of Hauptmann Franz Ulmann in the television series Colditz (1972–1974).

Biography 
Meyer was born in Paulpietersburg, Natal Province, Union of South Africa in July 1925. He worked initially as a model where he posed for book covers until a friend in Germany working for an advertising agency lined up his first work as an actor, a television advert for Puschkin Vodka. The brand became Germany's best selling vodka and Meyer became known as "Frank S. Thorn" The Puschkin Man. He was hired by Anatole Litvak as an extra for his film The Night of the Generals. 

In the 1960s, he played supporting roles in numerous French films alongside French cinema stars such as Lino Ventura, Alain Delon and Jean-Paul Belmondo. In 1966, he was engaged for La grande vadrouille, where he embodied an angry SS representative. In 1968 he played in the action thriller The Devil's Garden by Yves Boisset. In 1969, he took on the role of Sheriff Blade in the thriller Les Étrangers, shot in Spain. In 1970 he played in the Western Cannon for Cordoba, in the role of the Swedish major Svedborg, the leader of a private mercenary army. In 1975 he had a small role in Stanley Kubrick's film adaptation of Barry Lyndon.

In the 1970s, Meyer also worked for television. He played a continuous series role in the British television series Colditz. In 1978, he appeared in the mini-series Holocaust (miniseries) - The History of the Weiss Family; in it, he played the SS official Ernst Kaltenbrunner. In the TV movie The Girlfriend from Childhood (L'amie d'enfance, 1981) from the Commissaire Moulin- series, he played the assassin, whom Yves Rénier and title heroine Claude Jade ultimately put to the test. He then appeared in other television series. He later appeared in Steven Spielberg and George Lucas's The Young Indiana Jones Chronicles as well as the French cult movie Brotherhood of the Wolf.

Meyer died in Neuilly-sur-Seine, France on 3 April 2020 at the age of 94.

Films and television

1961: The President - Un motard (uncredited)
1965: Pierrot le Fou - Gangster (uncredited)
1966: Culpable para un delito - Martín Baumer
1966: La Grande Vadrouille - Officer S.S. Otto Weber
1966: Little Girls - Mike
1967: The Night of the Generals - Wehrmacht Adjutant (uncredited)
1967: The Last Adventure - Le mercenaire
1967:  - Mike
1967: Réseau secret - Hermann Glöckel
1967:  - Sorenson
1967:  - Schrank
1968: Coplan Saves His Skin - Hugo
1968: Koenigsmark (TV Movie) - Le grand Duc
1969:  - Varen
1969: The Troubleshooters (TV Series) - Joachim Schmitt-Klever
1969: S.O.S. fréquence 17 (TV Series)
1969:  - Blade
1969: Department S (TV Series) - Lucky Le Beau
1970: Codename (TV Series) - General Hovaths
1970: Cannon for Cordoba - Svedborg
1970: The Great White Hope - Prussian Officer in beer garden (uncredited)
1970:  - Marc
1970: Les enfants de Caïn
1971: Paul Temple (TV Series) - Brad
1971: Perched on a Tree - Colonel Muller
1971: Kate (TV Series) - Frohl Svenson
1971:  - Helmut
1971: Jason King (TV Series) - Angelo
1972: Pic et pic et colegram - Jeroboam
1973: Le Magnifique - Colonel Collins
1973: La folie Almayer (TV Movie) - Le capitaine Linguard
1972–1974: Colditz (TV Series) - Hauptmann Franz Ulmann
1974: Thriller (TV Series) - Karl Vorster
1974: Heidi - Grandfather
1975: Quiller (TV Series) - Major Hardtmann
1975: Barry Lyndon - Prussian Officer
1976: Blondie - Inspector
1976: Les Monte-en-l'air (TV Movie) - Breifer
1976: The Howerd Confessions (TV Series) - Lieutenant Gruber
1977:  (TV Mini-Series) - L'agent des trafiquants
1977:  - Général Von Richter
1978: Holocaust (TV Mini-Series) - Ernst Kaltenbrunner
1978: Les grandes conjurations: Le connétable de Bourbon (TV Movie) - Frunsberg
1979: La nuit claire - Pluton
1979: The Riddle of the Sands - Grimm
1979: La Gueule de l'autre - Richard Krauss
1979: Quest of Eagles (TV Series) - Sandor
1980: Strangulation Blues (short)
1980:  (TV Series)
1981: BBC2 Playhouse (TV Series) - Janos Almasy
1981: Commissaire Moulin (TV Series): L'Amie d'enfance - L'assassin au grenade
1981:  (TV Series) - Driscoll
1982:  (TV Series) - Von Postel
1982: Inside the Third Reich (TV Movie) - Ernst Kaltenbrunner
1983: Les poneys sauvages (TV Mini-Series)
1984: Boy Meets Girl - Le cosmonaute
1984: Tueur maison (Short)
1985:  - Le responsable de la station Malabar
1985: Red Sonja - Red Sonja's Father
1979–1985: Minder (TV Series) - Kurt Wengler / Maurice Bonnet
1986: The Night Is Young - Hans
1988: Ville étrangère - L'ambassadeur
1988: M'as-tu-vu ? (TV Series)
1989: Céleri remoulade (Short)
1987–1989: William Tell (TV Series) - Tyroll / Tyrrol
1989: Roselyne et les lions - Rainer
1989: La Révolution française - Le Duc de Brunswick
1989: Bunker Palace Hôtel - Le président
1989:  - Nazi General
1990: Counterstrike (TV Series) - Kurtz
1990: Cantara (TV miniseries)
1990: Artcore oder Der Neger
1991: Navarro (TV Series) - Sauveur
1991: Un privé au soleil (TV Series)
1991: Dingo - Paris Jazz Club owner (uncredited)
1991: Renseignements généraux (TV Series) - Baltar
1992: The Case-Book of Sherlock Holmes (TV Series) - Hebworth (Alias Veitch)
1983–1992: Les Cinq Dernières Minutes (TV Series) - Haltman / Hafner
1992: The Young Indiana Jones Chronicles (TV Series) - German Officer #2
1992: Sniper 2: L'affaire Petracci (TV Movie) - Bababoum
1992: Lycée alpin (TV Series)
1992: The New Statesman (TV Series) - Herr Wessel
1992: Une cuillerée pour papa (Short)
1992: John (Short) - John / Tarzan
1993: La grande collection: Senso (TV Movie) - Le général Hautmann
1993: Le JAP, juge d'application des peines (TV Series)
1993: Artcore oder Der Neger
1994: 
1995: Machinations (TV Movie)
1995: La Rivière Espérance (TV Mini-Series) - Commandant du Duguay-Trouin
1995: L'entretien (Short)
1997: Entre les vagues (Short)
1997: Double Team - British Man
1997: K - Gûter
1997: Inspecteur Moretti (TV Series) - Le Vieux
2000: Le birdwatcher - Mitch Glassborough
2001: Le pacte des loups - Marquis d'Apcher
2002: Morteterre (Short) - Compt Klaus de Rexel
2003: The Dope - Rudolf Maier
2003: Baptiste (Short)
2003: Ripoux 3 - Van der Brook
2004: Albert est méchant - James Lord Cooke
2005: Sauf le respect que je vous dois - Lunel
2006: Final Sentence (Short) - The Inquisitor - The priest
2007: La piscine de maman (Short)
2007: How Much We Hated Each Other (TV Movie) - Konrad Adenauer
2008: Collection Fred Vargas (TV Series) - Fulgence
2010: Hitler à Hollywood - Luis Aramchek
2014: Cruel - Le libraire (final film role)

References

External links

hansmeyer.info The official Hans Meyer website

1925 births
2020 deaths
People from eDumbe Local Municipality
South African male film actors
South African male television actors
South African people of German descent
White South African people
South African expatriates in France